Trichopoda lanipes is a species of bristle fly in the family Tachinidae.  It is found in North America.

References

Further reading

External links

 

Phasiinae